Močna is a settlement in the Municipality of Lenart in northeastern Slovenia. It lies in the Slovene Hills on the main regional road from Maribor to Lenart. The area is part of the traditional region of Styria. It is now included in the Drava Statistical Region.

A small chapel in the settlement dates to around 1800.

References

External links
Močna on Geopedia

Populated places in the Municipality of Lenart